Jucy may refer to:

 Jucy Group Limited, a car rental and tourism company, doing business as JUCY
 Jucy (film), an Australian comedy film produced in 2010

See also
Juicy (disambiguation)